The Boskop Man is an anatomically modern human fossil of the Middle Stone Age (Late Pleistocene) discovered in 1913 in South Africa.
The fossil was at first described as Homo capensis and considered a separate human species by Broom (1918),
but by the 1970s this "Boskopoid" type was widely recognized as representative of the modern Khoisan populations.

Discovery
Most theories regarding a "Boskopoid" type were based on the eponymous Boskop cranium, which was found in 1913 by two Afrikaner farmers. They offered it to Frederick William FitzSimons for examination and further research. Many similar skulls were subsequently discovered by paleontologists such as Robert Broom, William Pycraft and Raymond Dart.

The original skull was incomplete consisting of frontal and parietal bones, with a partial occiput, one temporal and a fragment of mandible. 

Fossils of similar type are known from Tsitsikamma (1921), Matjes River (1934), Fish Hoek and Springbok Flats,
Skhul, Qazeh, Border Cave, Brno, Tuinplaas, and other locations.

Cranial capacity
The Boskop Man fossils are notable for their unusually large cranial capacities, with reported cranial-capacity ranges between 1,700 and 2,000 cm3. 

This was addressed in the book Big Brain: The Origins and Future of Human Intelligence (2008) by neurologists Gary Lynch and  Richard Granger, who claimed the large brain size in Boskop individuals might be indicative of particularly high general intelligence. Anthropologist John Hawks harshly criticized the depiction of the Boskop fossils in the book and in the book's review article in Discover magazine.

Fraudulent photograph
An image has circulated across the Internet which is purported to be of a Boskopoid skull. However, this image in actuality depicts the skull of a hydrocephalus patient.

See also
Wajak Man

References

 
Tobias, P.V. (1959) "The history and metamorphosis of the Boskop concept" in: Galloway (ed.), The Skeletal Remains of Bambandyanalo, 137–146.
 

Homo sapiens fossils
Fossils of South Africa
1913 in paleontology